The Liberation of Kuwait was a U.S.-led military operation to retake Kuwait from Iraq after the massive air campaign, between 24–28 February 1991. U.S. and coalition troops entered to find the Iraqis surrendering en masse; however, pockets of resistance existed, particularly at Kuwait International Airport where Iraqi troops, seemingly unaware that a retreat order had been issued to them, continued to fight, resulting in a fierce battle over the airport itself. The majority of the fighting took place in Iraq, rather than Kuwait. The operation was in the later stages of the Gulf War.

Prelude

A force composed of 40 amphibious assault ships was stationed off the coast of Kuwait and Saudi Arabia. It was the largest such force to be assembled since the Battle of Inchon.  Days before the attack, an amphibious force made repeated feint attacks and landings at Kuwait City, attempting to fool the Iraqis into thinking the coalition would attack via amphibious assault. Instead, the troops were to enter by the southern border of Kuwait. The Coalition forces based there soon became accustomed to the constant Scud missile threats, chemical missile threats, and near-constant shelling by Iraqi artillery.

Campaign

At 4 a.m. on 24 February, after being shelled for months and under the constant threat of a gas attack, the U.S. 1st and 2nd Marine Divisions crossed into Kuwait. They maneuvered around vast systems of barbed wire, minefields and trenches. Once into Kuwait, they headed towards Kuwait City. The troops themselves encountered little resistance and, apart from several minor tank battles, were met primarily by surrendering soldiers. The general pattern was that coalition troops would encounter Iraqi soldiers who would put up a brief fight before deciding to surrender.

On 27 February, Saddam Hussein issued a retreat order to his troops in Kuwait; however, one unit of Iraqi troops appeared to have not gotten the retreat order. When the U.S. Marines arrived at Kuwait International Airport, they encountered fierce resistance, and it took them several hours to gain control and secure the airport. As part of the retreat order, the Iraqis carried out a "scorched earth" policy that included setting hundreds of oil wells on fire in an effort to destroy the Kuwaiti economy. After the battle at Kuwait International Airport, the U.S. Marines stopped at the outskirts of Kuwait City, allowing their coalition allies to take and occupy Kuwait City, effectively ending combat operations in the Kuwaiti theater of the war.

Result

After four days of fighting, all Iraqi troops were expelled from Kuwait, ending a nearly seven-month occupation of Kuwait by Iraq. A little over 1,100 casualties were suffered by the Coalition.  Estimates of Iraqi casualties range from 30,000 to 150,000.  Iraq lost thousands of vehicles, while the advancing Coalition lost relatively few; Iraq's obsolete Soviet T-72 tanks proved no match for the American M1 Abrams and British Challenger tanks.

References

External links
Liberation of Kuwait (Video)
Bibliography of the Desert Shield and Desert Storm compiled by the United States Army Center of Military History

Conflicts in 1991
1991 in Kuwait
Military operations of the Gulf War
United States Marine Corps in the 20th century
Gulf War
February 1991 events in Asia